Koruthaialos is an Indomalayan genus of grass skippers in the family Hesperiidae.

Species
Koruthaialos butleri (de Nicéville, 1884) - Assam, Malaya, Vietnam, Burma, Thailand, Laos, Yunnan
Koruthaialos focula (Plötz, 1882) - Java, Sumatra, Borneo
Koruthaialos frena Evans, 1949
Koruthaialos rubecula (Plötz, 1882) - Burma, Thailand, Laos, Vietnam, Yunnan, Langkawi, Malaysia, Borneo, Sumatra, Natuna, Bali, Philippines, Sumatra, Nias, Assam, Bangladesh
Koruthaialos sindu (de Nicéville, 1884) - Assam, Burma, Thailand, Laos, Vietnam, Malaysia, Yunnan, Borneo, Sumatra, Java, Batoe, Siberut, Bali, Yunnan
Koruthaialos swinhoei Elwes & Edwards, 1897

References
Natural History Museum Lepidoptera genus database
Funet
Images representing Koruthaialos  at  Consortium for the Barcode of Life

Ancistroidini
Hesperiidae genera
Taxa named by Edward Yerbury Watson